Max Ram (born 27 November 2000) is an English professional footballer who plays for Inverness Caledonian Thistle as a central defender.

Career
Ram began his career with Leicester City and Nottingham Forest, later playing in non-League with Stratford Town after being released. He signed a one-year contract with Wycombe Wanderers in August 2021. On 19 November 2021, Ram joined National League South side Hungerford Town on a 28-day loan deal.

On 28 June 2022, Ram joined Inverness Caledonian Thistle in the Scottish Championship.

References

2000 births
Living people
English footballers
Leicester City F.C. players
Nottingham Forest F.C. players
Stratford Town F.C. players
Wycombe Wanderers F.C. players
Hungerford Town F.C. players
Inverness Caledonian Thistle F.C. players
Association football defenders
Scottish Professional Football League players
National League (English football) players